Reisdorf can refer to:

 Reisdorf (Luxembourgish: Reisduerf) is a commune and small town in eastern Luxembourg.
 Reisdorf, Thuringia, a municipality of Weimarer Land.